Mrzla Luža is a small settlement in the Municipality of Trebnje in eastern Slovenia. It lies just east of Velika Loka on the road leading to Račje Selo. The area is part of the historical region of Lower Carniola. The municipality is now included in the Southeast Slovenia Statistical Region.

References

External links
Mrzla Luža at Geopedia

Populated places in the Municipality of Trebnje